Monika Das is an Indian politician. She was a Member of Parliament, representing Karnataka in the Rajya Sabha the upper house of India's Parliament representing the Indian National Congress.

References

1939 births
Living people
Rajya Sabha members from Karnataka
Indian National Congress politicians